The Wegener Halvo Formation is a geologic formation in Greenland. It preserves fossils dating back to the Triassic period.

See also 

 List of fossiliferous stratigraphic units in Greenland

References

External links 
 

Geologic formations of Greenland
Triassic Greenland
Permian northern paleotemperate deposits